Clusia polystigma is a species of flowering plant in the family Clusiaceae. It is found only in Ecuador. Its natural habitat is subtropical or tropical moist lowland forest.

References

polystigma
Endemic flora of Ecuador
Vulnerable plants
Taxonomy articles created by Polbot